Llanarth is a rural locality in the Charters Towers Region, Queensland, Australia.

Heritage listings
Llanarth has a number of heritage-listed sites, including:
 St Annes Road: Suttor River Causeway on the Old Bowen Downs Road

References

Charters Towers Region
Localities in Queensland